Christine Nafula (born 10 November 1991) is a Kenyan football midfielder, who last played for Kayseri Kadın FK in the Turkish Women's Super League. She has been a member of the Kenya women's national team.

Family life 
Nafula comes from a footballing family. She is a younger daughter of a family of six. Her brother Eric Johanna Omondi plays for Jönköpings Södra and previously played for Mathare United, while Felix Oucho also played for Mathare United and is currently a coach at a club in Busia. Her other brother, Anthony Kadudu featured for Tusker FC whilst her elder sister, Doreen Nabwire is a former footballer for the Kenya women's national team.

Club career 
By March 2022, Nafula moved to Turkey, and signed with Kayseri Kadın FK to play in the second half of the 2021–22 Super League season. She scored one goal in ten matches capped.

International career 
Nafula played for Kenya national team at the 2016 Africa Women Cup of Nations. At the time, her sister was the team manager.

See also 
List of Kenya women's international footballers

References 

1991 births
Living people
People from Busia County
Women's association football midfielders
Kenyan women's footballers
Kenya women's international footballers
Kenyan expatriate footballers
Kenyan expatriate sportspeople in Turkey
Expatriate women's footballers in Turkey
Kayseri Women's footballers